Nanhai Senior High School, the largest boarding school in Foshan, Guangdong, was founded in 1907. The school is located at the foot of Xiqiao Mountain, adjacent to the new Xiqiao Bridge.

The School Culture

The school badge 
The school badge of Nanhai Senior High School is a floating golden flag constituted of the letters “N” and “H”, surrounded by a blue circle.

The school activities 
The school organizes a variety of activities, including orienteering, debates, singing contests and so on. There are over 30 associations in the school, organizing cultural activities regularly.

The History of Nanhai Senior High School

The timeline of the school in Guangzhou 
 In 1907, Nanhai Senior High School was founded at No. 360, Xihu Road, Guangzhou.
 In 1910, the school was relocated at No. 460, Xihua Road, Guangzhou.
 In 1912, the school was officially entitled “Nanhai Senior High School”.
 In 1922, the school board was founded.
 In 1937, Nanhai Senior High school was awarded as one of the nine most outstanding high school in China. 
 During the Anti-Japanese War, the school was relocated at Foshan, Zhongshan, and Macao.
 In 1947, the school was relocated back on Xihua Road, Guangzhou.
 In 1953, Nanhai Senior High School came within the jurisdiction of Guangzhou, so the school and Guangzhou Wanshan Senior High School were amalgamated into single one, renamed The Eleventh Senior High School in Guangzhou.

The timeline of the school at Fengdi on Xiqiao Mountain, Nanhai, Foshan 
 In 1962, Overseas Chinese established Nanhai Overseas Chinese Senior High School at Fengdi on Xiqiao Mountain, Nanhai District, Foshan City. 
 In 1968, the school was renamed Nanhai Hongwei Senior High School due to the Great Cultural Revolution. 
 In 1973, the school was renamed Nanhai Xiqiao Senior High School.

The timeline of the school at the foot of Xiqiao Mountain, Nanhai, Foshan 

 In 1938, the school was relocated at the foot of Xiqiao Mountain, Nanhai District, Foshan City. And it was renamed Nanhai Senior High School.
 In 1988, Nanhai Senior High School was awarded as a county-level key high school.
 In 2001, the branch school of Nanhai Senior High School  was founded in Shatou, Jiujiang Town, Nanhai District, Foshan City.

The Design of Nanhai Senior High School 

Established at the foot of Xiqiao Mountain, the design of the school is ladder-like. From the gymnasium with the lowest altitude to the basketball court at the hilltop, there are 251 stone steps, with a height of over 60 meters. There are four pavilions in the school, including Yangsheng Tai, Dishuiyan Pavilion, Siyuan Pavilion, and Zhiyuan Pavilion. And there are six gardens, including Pastoral Garden, Mango Garden, Biological Garden, Bamboo Garden, Orange Osmanthus Garden, and Zhiyuan Garden. With galleries throughout the school, the teaching buildings, dormitories, and the athletic field are connected.

The Staff and Students 
There are 241 teachers in Nanhai Senior High School, including 80 senior teachers, 30 doctoral candidates, and a foreign teacher. There are 61 classes in the school, with more than 3000 students. Independent study and tutorial system are forms of education offered by the school.

References 

High schools in Guangdong